Phosphorus trifluoride (formula PF3), is a colorless and odorless gas.  It is highly toxic and reacts slowly with water.  Its main use is as a ligand in metal complexes. As a ligand, it parallels carbon monoxide in metal carbonyls, and indeed its toxicity is due to its binding with the iron in blood hemoglobin in a similar way to carbon monoxide.

Physical properties
Phosphorus trifluoride has an F−P−F bond angle of approximately 96.3°. Gaseous PF3 has a standard enthalpy of formation of −945 kJ/mol (−226 kcal/mol). The phosphorus atom has a nuclear magnetic resonance chemical shift of 97 ppm (downfield of H3PO4).

Properties
Phosphorus trifluoride hydrolyzes especially at high pH, but it is less hydrolytically sensitive than phosphorus trichloride. It does not attack glass except at high temperatures, and anhydrous potassium hydroxide may be used to dry it with little loss. With hot metals, phosphides and fluorides are formed. With Lewis bases such as ammonia addition products (adducts) are formed, and PF3 is oxidized by oxidizing agents such as bromine or potassium permanganate.

As a ligand for transition metals, PF3 is a strong π-acceptor.
It forms a variety of metal complexes with metals in low oxidation states. PF3 forms several complexes for which the corresponding CO derivatives (see metal carbonyl) are unstable or nonexistent. Thus, Pd(PF3)4 is known, but Pd(CO)4 is not.  Such complexes are usually prepared directly from the related metal carbonyl compound, with loss of CO.  However, nickel metal reacts directly with PF3 at 100 °C under 35 MPa pressure to form Ni(PF3)4, which is analogous to Ni(CO)4.  Cr(PF3)6, the analogue of Cr(CO)6, may be prepared from dibenzenechromium:

Cr(C6H6)2  +  6 PF3  →  Cr(PF3)6  +  2 C6H6

Preparation
Phosphorus trifluoride is usually prepared from phosphorus trichloride via halogen exchange using various fluorides such as hydrogen fluoride, calcium fluoride, arsenic trifluoride, antimony trifluoride, or zinc fluoride:

2 PCl3  +  3 ZnF2  →  2 PF3  +  3 ZnCl2

Biological activity
Phosphorus trifluoride is similar to carbon monoxide in that it is a gas which strongly binds to iron in hemoglobin, preventing the blood from absorbing oxygen.

Precautions
PF3 is highly toxic, comparable to phosgene.

References

Further reading

External links
National Pollutant Inventory - Fluoride and compounds fact sheet
WebBook page for PF3

Phosphorus fluorides
Phosphorus(III) compounds
Blood agents